The Child Crusoes is a 1911 American silent black and white adventure film directed by Van Dyke Brooke, written by Marison Ziegfeld and starring Norma Talmadge, and Helene and Dolores Costello.

Cast
 Tefft Johnson as Captain Rhines
 Kenneth Casey as Jack - A Young Stowaway
 Adele DeGarde as May - The Captain's Daughter
 Leo Delaney
 Norma Talmadge
 Ralph Ince
 Edith Storey
 Helene Costello
 Dolores Costello
 William Shea

References

External links
 

American silent short films
American black-and-white films
American adventure films
1910s adventure films
Films directed by Van Dyke Brooke
Vitagraph Studios short films
General Film Company
1910s American films
Silent adventure films